The short-nosed harvest mouse (Reithrodontomys brevirostris) is a species of rodent in the family Cricetidae found in Costa Rica and Nicaragua.

References

Reithrodontomys
Rodents of Central America
Mammals described in 1943
Taxonomy articles created by Polbot